Artem Vladimirovich Chigvintsev (born 12 June 1982) is a Russian professional dancer, specializing in Latin dancing.

Chigvintsev was a cast member of Burn the Floor where he performed both on Broadway and more recently in the West End in 2009. Chigvintsev joined Strictly Come Dancing in 2010 straight from Burn the Floor. He won the show in his first year with his celebrity partner Kara Tointon.

Early life 
Chigvintsev was born at Izhevsk, Udmurt Autonomous Soviet Socialist Republic, RSFSR, Soviet Union. He moved to the United States in 2003 and began dancing with champion ballroom dancer Giselle Peacock. Chigvintsev auditioned to appear as a contestant on the first series of So You Think You Can Dance. Chigvintsev was eliminated alongside his fellow contestant Melissa Vella, but returned as a guest choreographer for season two.

Strictly Come Dancing
In September 2010, Chigvintsev joined Strictly Come Dancing series 8 as a professional dancer, where he was partnered with actress Kara Tointon. The pair achieved good scores in the first five weeks of 30, 32, 31, 32, and 37. In week 5, they were awarded the first 10 of the series by Alesha Dixon for their paso doble. In week 6 they were top of the leaderboard with their salsa. They also had good scores for the next five weeks of 36, 38, 35, 34, and 38. In week 11, they got their highest score of 39 for the Viennese Waltz and Rumba and got the maximum 5/5 for the swing-a-thon. Chigvintsev and Tointon made it to the final along with Matt Baker and Pamela Stephenson. The pair went on to win the competition, defeating Matt Baker and his partner Aliona Vilani, and being crowned series champions for 2010. Chigvintsev is one of five professionals to win the series as a first-time Strictly pro.

In 2011's Strictly Come Dancing season 9 Chigvintsev was partnered with Holly Valance. He and Valance made it to Week 11, the semi-finals, before being eliminated.

Chigvintsev's celebrity partner in the 10th series of Strictly Come Dancing was television presenter Fern Britton. They were eliminated in Week 6.

His celebrity partner in the eleventh series of Strictly Come Dancing was former Coronation Street star Natalie Gumede, who played Kirsty Soames. They reached the finals and became one of the runners-up, along with Susanna Reid and Kevin Clifton, losing to model Abbey Clancy.

Highest and lowest performances per dance

Chigvintsev was injured, so Brendan Cole performed with Valance.

Series 8: with celebrity partner Kara Tointon

Series 9: with celebrity partner Holly Valance

Series 10: with celebrity partner Fern Britton

Series 11: with celebrity partner Natalie Gumede

Dancing with the Stars
In 2014, after competing on the 11th series of Strictly, Chigvintsev appeared in the 18th season of Dancing with the Stars as a member of the Dance Troupe. Later that year, it was announced that Chigvintsev had been promoted to professional dancer for the show's 19th season, marking his exit from Strictly Come Dancing.

He was paired for season 19 with actress Lea Thompson. The couple was eliminated in week 9 (the quarterfinals) and finished in sixth place.

He returned for season 20 and paired with award-winning singer Patti LaBelle. The couple was eliminated on week 6 and finished in eighth place.

On 19 August 2015, Chigvintsev was announced as one of the professional dancers for season 21 of Dancing with the Stars. However, when the full season 21 cast was revealed with their partners, Chigvintsev was not part of the lineup. Chigvintsev wrote on Instagram that he would not be competing on season 21 due to a last-minute casting change, but he would still dance with the pros in the ballroom. It was later revealed that former Bachelorette Kaitlyn Bristowe was meant to compete alongside him that season, but was prevented by Bachelor producer Mike Fleiss. Bristowe would partner with Artem five years later (2020) on season 29.

Chigvintsev returned for season 22 partnering with actress Mischa Barton. They were eliminated on Week 3 of competition and finished in 11th place.

For season 23, he was paired with Brady Bunch actress and author Maureen McCormick. McCormick and Chigvintsev were eliminated in week 7 finishing in 8th place.

For season 24, he was paired with former figure skater Nancy Kerrigan. On 1 May 2017, Kerrigan and Chigvintsev were eliminated in a double elimination along with The Bachelor star Nick Viall and Peta Murgatroyd.

For season 25, he was paired with WWE wrestler Nikki Bella. They were eliminated in week 7 of the competition in a double elimination only announced at the end of the show. This marked the third season in a row where Artem and his partner left in the seventh week of competition and the second in a row where he left as part of a double elimination.

For season 26, he was partnered with Olympic snowboarder Jamie Anderson. They were eliminated in the first week of competition, tying for ninth place with Johnny Damon and Emma Slater. This marked the third season in a row where Chigvintsev left as part of a double elimination.

For season 27, he was paired with Paralympic skier Danelle Umstead. The couple was eliminated in week 2 and finished in 12th place.

Chigvintsev did not appear in season 28, but returned for season 29 with Bristowe. They were announced as the winners of the competition on the season finale. This was Chigvinstev's first win in his nine seasons on the show and made him the only professional dancer to win both DWTS and the original (UK) version Strictly Come Dancing.

For season 30, he was paired with actress Melora Hardin. They were eliminated in the semifinals and finished in 6th place.

For season 31, he was paired with social media personality Heidi D'Amelio. They were eliminated in the quarterfinals and finished in 8th place.

Season 19 with celebrity partner Lea Thompson

1 Score given by guest judge Kevin Hart in place of Goodman.

2 The American public scored the dance in place of Goodman with the averaged score being counted alongside the three other judges.

3This week only, for "Partner Switch-Up" week, Thompson performed with Valentin Chmerkovskiy instead of Chigvinstev. Chigvintsev performed with Janel Parrish.

4Score given by guest judge Jessie J in place of Goodman.

5Score given by guest judge Pitbull in place of Goodman.

Season 20 with celebrity partner Patti LaBelle

Season 22 with celebrity partner Mischa Barton

Season 23 with celebrity partner Maureen McCormick

1 Score given by guest judge Pitbull.

Season 24 with celebrity partner Nancy Kerrigan

1 Score given by guest judge Nick Carter.2 Score given by guest judge Mandy Moore.

Season 25 with celebrity partner Nikki Bella

1 Score given by guest judge Shania Twain

Season 26 with celebrity partner Jamie Anderson

Season 27 with celebrity partner Danelle Umstead

Season 29 with celebrity partner Kaitlyn Bristowe

Season 30 with celebrity partner Melora Hardin

Season 31 with celebrity partner Heidi D'Amelio 

1 Score given by guest judge Michael Buble.

So You Think You Can Dance
In 2011, Chigvintsev was a choreographer on the British adaptation of So You Think You Can Dance. He choreographed a Viennese Waltz to "She's Always a Woman" by Billy Joel for Katie Love & Luke Jackson.  He choreographed a Cha-Cha-Cha to "Judas" by Lady Gaga for Bethany Rose Harrison & Lee Bridgman. For the final, he choreographed a Tango to "I've Seen That Face Before (Libertango)" by Grace Jones for Katie Love & Luke Jackson.

Other work
In 2009, he appeared in the music video for Hush Hush; Hush Hush by The Pussycat Dolls, dancing with Nicole Scherzinger.

In 2011, Chigvintsev acted the part of lead choreographer in the CBeebies Christmas Pantomime, Cinderella.

Chigvintsev has also appeared in an episode of the TV show The O.C. and in the movie I Now Pronounce You Chuck and Larry.

In October 2020, he made a guest appearance in an episode, “Sister, Sister and a Babymoon” of the American reality TV show, Keeping Up with the Kardashians to teach Kris Jenner and her boyfriend ballroom dancing. He has also made another guest appearance on another American reality TV show, Paris in Love. In an episode, "Too Close for Carter," in January 2022 to teach Paris Hilton and her former fiancé now husband some dance moves for their wedding reception.

Chigvintsev appeared as a main cast member on the E! reality show, Total Bellas, for the show's fifth and sixth season.

Personal life
Chigvintsev was married to his dancing partner, Giselle Peacock, from 2004 to 2005. He dated Carrie Ann Inaba from 2006 to 2008. Chigvintsev became a naturalized U.S. citizen on September 17, 2014. In November 2019, he got engaged to Total Bellas star, and retired WWE wrestler, Nikki Bella, who was his celebrity partner on the 25th season of Dancing with the Stars. On January 29, 2020, Nikki and Artem announced they were expecting their first child, just a week and a half after Nikki's twin sister, Brie, announced she was expecting her second child. Bella gave birth to Matteo Artemovich Chigvintsev on July 31, 2020. The pair got married on August 26, 2022.

References

External links
 ArtemChigvintsev.com

 

1982 births
Living people
People from Izhevsk
Russian ballroom dancers
Russian male dancers
Russian emigrants to the United States
American ballroom dancers
American male dancers
So You Think You Can Dance (American TV series) contestants
Strictly Come Dancing winners
So You Think You Can Dance choreographers
Dancing with the Stars (American TV series) winners
21st-century American dancers
21st-century Russian dancers